Route 2, also known as Veterans Memorial Highway and the All Weather Highway, is a  two-lane uncontrolled access highway traversing Prince Edward Island, Canada from Tignish to Souris. Route 2 was recognized as the first numbered highway in the province in 1890, when it opened between Charlottetown and Summerside.

It passes through the cities of Summerside and Charlottetown and roughly parallels the former primary railway line through the province, which was abandoned in 1989.

The highway was first paved in the 1950s with many upgrades in recent decades. A perimeter arterial highway (ring road) across the northern and eastern part of Charlottetown was constructed as part of Route 2 in the 1990s with funding from a $200 million federal adjustment fund for road construction after the railway was abandoned. This section of road was extended to Upton Road and is now signed for Route 1 (the Trans-Canada Highway), although Route 2 uses a small portion of the arterial highway between the Malpeque Road and St. Peter's Highway.

Names
Route 2 is commonly called the "All Weather Highway," as it was one of the first roads in Prince Edward Island to be open for traffic in all seasons. In June 2002, premier Pat Binns designated the highway the "Veterans Memorial Highway". Transportation minister Don MacKinnon said that the designation honoured the highway's vital role in the Second World War, when it provided "a transportation link to the military facilities of CFB Summerside and the air training facility in Mount Pleasant". 

Route 2 has several local names:
 Souris Road (Souris to Route 4 at Dingwells Mills)
 St. Peter's Highway (Dingwells Mills to Charlottetown)
 Malpeque Road (Charlottetown to Hunter River); the Malpeque Road alignment continuing thereafter on the Old Princetown Road
 New Annan Road (Kensington to Summerside)
 Western Road (Summerside to Tignish)

Mount Pleasant diversion
The portion of the highway running through the farming hamlet of Mount Pleasant west of Summerside was diverted for several years during the 1940s with the establishment of an air force base named RCAF Station Mount Pleasant. The base was closed following World War II and the "Western Road" was returned to its original alignment which currently runs along the former flight line and tarmac of the air force base. The diversion road constructed around the base is still in use as a local public road.

Major intersections

References

002
002
002
002
002
Summerside, Prince Edward Island
Transport in Charlottetown